Paul Roberts (born 27 April 1962) is an English former professional footballer who played as a full back, making over 400 appearances in the Football League.

Career
Born in West Ham, Roberts began his career as an apprentice at Millwall, making his senior debut in 1978. Roberts also played for Brentford, Swindon Town, Southend United, Aldershot, Leytonstone & Ilford, Exeter City, Fisher Athletic, Colchester United and Chesham United. He was player-manager of Chesham during the 1994–95 season, which saw them relegated from the Isthmian League Premier Division. He later became a London Cab driver.

Honours

Club
Millwall
 FA Youth Cup winner: 1978–79

Swindon Town
 Football League Fourth Division winner: 1985–86

Colchester United
 Football Conference winner: 1991–92
 FA Trophy winner: 1991–92

Individual
 Millwall Player of the Year: 1981
 Colchester United Player of the Year: 1993

References

External links

Paul Roberts at Coludata.co.uk

1962 births
Living people
Footballers from West Ham
English footballers
Association football defenders
Millwall F.C. players
Brentford F.C. players
Swindon Town F.C. players
Southend United F.C. players
Aldershot F.C. players
Redbridge Forest F.C. players
Exeter City F.C. players
Fisher Athletic F.C. players
Colchester United F.C. players
Chesham United F.C. players
English Football League players
English football managers